Charles Kerry Brown (born October 13, 1948), sometimes mis-spelled Charles Kelly Brown, and sometimes known by the nickname "Good Grief", was an American football wide receiver.

A native of Oakland California, Brown attended Castlemont High School in that city. He began playing college football at Merritt Junior College in Oakland. In 1968, he transferred to Northern Arizona University as a sociology student and a split end for the 1968 and 1969 football teams. During the 1969 season, he broke Norther Arizona single-season records 63 receptions, 1,134 receiving yards (nearly doubling the prior record of 601 receiving yards), and 11 receiving touchdowns. He also set single-game school records with 12 receptions in one game and 245 receiving yards and three touchdown receptions in another game. 

He was selected by the Detroit Lions in the 14th round (357th overall pick) of the 1970 NFL Draft and impressed coaches during the Lions' training camp. He appeared in 14 games during the 1970 season, but totaled only two passes for 38 yards. His career was stymied by military service in 1971 and torn cartilage that required surgery on a knee.

References

1948 births
Living people
American football wide receivers
Northern Arizona Lumberjacks football players
Detroit Lions players
Players of American football from Oakland, California